is a Japanese sprinter. He competed in the men's 4 × 400 metres relay at the 1964 Summer Olympics.

References

1941 births
Living people
Japanese male sprinters
Olympic male sprinters
Olympic athletes of Japan
Athletes (track and field) at the 1964 Summer Olympics
Asian Games gold medalists for Japan
Asian Games medalists in athletics (track and field)
Athletes (track and field) at the 1966 Asian Games
Medalists at the 1966 Asian Games
Japan Championships in Athletics winners
Place of birth missing (living people)
20th-century Japanese people